Danielle Cormack (born 26 December 1970) is a New Zealand stage and screen actress. She was one of the original cast members of the long-running soap opera Shortland Street, though she is also known for her role as the Amazon Ephiny in the television series Xena: Warrior Princess, Cynthia Ross in The Cult, and Shota in Legend of the Seeker. Other works include the 2009 film, Separation City, and the Australian series Rake. She also portrayed notorious Sydney underworld figure Kate Leigh in Underbelly: Razor, Doctor  Rory Finch in Jack Irish and Bea Smith in the Foxtel prison drama Wentworth, in which she starred for four years before leaving the show in 2016.

Personal life
Cormack has two children: Te Ahi Ka with fellow actor Pana Hema Taylor, born 19 March 2010 and Ethan (born in 1996), from a previous relationship. In an interview with LOTL Magazine, Cormack mentioned that she has had long-term relationships with both men and women, and indicated that she prefers to avoid applying labels to patterns of sexuality.

Filmography

Film

Television

Theatre

Awards

References

External links

1970 births
Bisexual actresses
New Zealand LGBT actors
Living people
Logie Award winners
New Zealand film actresses
New Zealand stage actresses
New Zealand television actresses
New Zealand soap opera actresses
People from Auckland
20th-century New Zealand actresses
21st-century New Zealand actresses
New Zealand theatre directors
People educated at Selwyn College, Auckland
21st-century New Zealand LGBT people